Estabrook Park is a Milwaukee County park in the village of Shorewood, Wisconsin and is home to the  WITI TV Tower and the historic Benjamin Church House. It was named for Charles E. Estabrook, a distinguished Wisconsin lawyer and politician, and is located on a nearly 125 acre, strip of land between the Milwaukee River and the former Chicago and Northwestern Railroad, now converted into part of the Oak Leaf Trail.

Amenities
There are picnic areas, soccer fields, a disc golf course, a softball diamond, a dog park, a beach volleyball court, a skatepark, and the Estabrook Park Beer Garden.

History
The riverside site was home to the Milwaukee Cement Company from 1875 to 1911. The park was established in 1916, and the first parkway in the Milwaukee River Parkway system was added in 1927. Significant development took place in the early and mid-1930s, led in part by the Civilian Conservation Corps. In 1937 Milwaukee County constructed a dam at the park to raise water levels for recreational purposes. A year later the Benjamin Church house was restored and moved to the park in 1938. The WITI TV Tower was erected within the park in 1962. In 2018 the dam was removed.

Pond
It is reported to contain panfish, trout, goldfish, chinese mystery snail, and Eurasian watermilfoil. There have also been sightings, depending on the season, of painted turtles, red-eared sliders, common snapping turtles, muskrats, American bullfrogs, American toads, Canada geese, mallards, wood ducks, blue-winged teals, great blue herons, green herons, red-breasted mergansers, hooded mergansers, pied-billed grebes, ring-billed gulls, and belted kingfishers in and on the water. Canada geese, mallards, and wood ducks have been observed to lay eggs, incubate them, and hatch broods of goslings and ducklings.

Beer garden
"Estabrook Beer Garden brought back the tradition of public beer gardens to Milwaukee."
"Estabrook Beer Garden is part of the Milwaukee County Park System, developed and operated under contract by ABC Estabrook INC d/b/a Estabrook Beer Garden."

Disc golf
There is a 20-hole disc golf course covering much of the northern end of the park.

Antennas
There are four broadcasting antenna in and near the park: one, free-standing tower antenna located entirely in the park at the south east corner, and three triangular lattice guyed mast antenna located just across the Milwaukee River from the park, each with a guy-wire anchor located in the park. From north to south, they are:
 WVTV
 WMVS
 WTMJ-TV
 WITI TV Tower

Geology
The Milwaukee Formation is exposed on the descent to the river.

Gallery

References

External links
Milwaukee Country Parks: Estabrook Park Map
Wisconsin Department of Natural Resources: Estabrook Park Lagoon
Friends of Estabrook Park

Protected areas of Milwaukee County, Wisconsin
Parks in Wisconsin

Civilian Conservation Corps in Wisconsin
Removed dams in Wisconsin